Jackie Joyner-Kersee Center (also known as JJK Center) is a St. Louis MetroLink station. It is adjacent to the Jackie Joyner-Kersee Youth Center and Jones Park in East St. Louis, Illinois. It is located just west of Metro's 29th Street Yard and just north of Interstate 64's exit 4B. This station has no park and ride lot but does feature a kiss-and-ride turnaround.

Station layout
The platform is accessed via a walkway from the bus loop. There is also a set of stairs from the bus loop down the embankment to 25th Street.

References

External links 
 St. Louis Metro

St. Clair County Transit District
MetroLink stations in St. Clair County, Illinois
Railway stations in the United States opened in 2001
Red Line (St. Louis MetroLink)
Blue Line (St. Louis MetroLink)
East St. Louis, Illinois